Anchoradiscoides is a genus of monogeneans belonging to the family Ancyrocephalidae.
All members of the genus are parasitic on North American centrachid fish.

Species
A single species is accepted according to the World Register of Marine Species: 

 Anchoradiscoides serpentinus Rogers, 1967

References

Ancyrocephalidae
Monogenea genera